Eleutherodactylus jaumei is a species of frog in the family Eleutherodactylidae. This critically endangered species is endemic to a tiny area in Sierra Maestra in southeastern Cuba, where it mostly lives in closed mesic forest.

It is part of a closely related Cuban group that contains five additional described species (E. cubanus, E. etheridgei, E. iberia, E. limbatus and  E. orientalis) and at least one undescribed species; most of which are of tiny size, relatively brightly colored and possibly aposematic (at least E. iberia and E. orientalis have alkaloid toxins in their skin).

References

jaumei
Endemic fauna of Cuba
Amphibians of Cuba
Amphibians described in 1997
Taxonomy articles created by Polbot